Teo is a Chinese surname (張、张 in Hokkien or Teochew) or a masculine given name or a nickname for Theodore, Teodor, Teofilo, Mateo, etc. It may refer to:



Surname 
 Charles Teo (born 1957), Australian neurosurgeon
 Teo Chee Hean (born 1954), Singaporean politician
 Teo Ho Pin (born 1960), Singaporean politician
 Josephine Teo (born 1968), Singaporean politician
 Nicholas Teo (born 1981), Malaysian Chinese singer
 Nicolette Teo (born 1986), Singaporean swimmer
 Sebastian Teo, Singaporean politician and businessman
 Teo Ser Luck (born 1968), Singaporean politician
 Teo Soon Kim (1904-1978), Singaporean lawyer
 Teo Ghim Heng (born 1975), Singaporean convicted murderer
 Teo Zi Ning (2013-2017), Singaporean murder victim who was killed by her father Teo Ghim Heng
 Felicia Teo Wei Ling (1988-2007), Singaporean student who was presumed missing in 2007 before she was revealed to be murdered
 Winnifred Teo Suan Lie (1967-1985), Singaporean student and victim of an unsolved rape and murder case

Given name 
 Teo González (born 1964), Spanish post-minimalist painter
 Teo Kardum (born 1986), Croatian footballer
 Teo Macero (1925–2008), American jazz musician, composer and record producer born Attilio Joseph Macero

Nickname 
 Teófilo Gutiérrez (born 1985), Colombian footballer better known as "Teo"
 Theodoros Papaloukas (born 1977), Greek basketball player nicknamed "Teo"
 Miloš Teodosić (born 1987), Serbian basketball player nicknamed "Teo"

See also 
 Theo, a given name
 Teoman, a Turkish name

Masculine given names